Veliki Nerajec is a village south of Dragatuš in the Municipality of Črnomelj in the White Carniola area of southeastern Slovenia. The area is part of the traditional region of Lower Carniola and is now included in the Southeast Slovenia Statistical Region.

A small chapel-shrine in the centre of the settlement is dedicated to the Holy Family and belongs to the Parish of Dragatuš.

References

External links
Veliki Nerajec on Geopedia

Populated places in the Municipality of Črnomelj